A3000 may refer to: 

 A3000 road (Great Britain), a road connecting Turnham Green and Chiswick 
 Acorn Archimedes 3000, a 1989 computer
 Commodore Amiga 3000, a 1990 computer
 Shizuoka Railway A3000 series EMU train
 Sony NW-A3000, a Walkman digital audio player